Christopher Corey Smith is an American voice actor who voices in animated shows and video games. He is best known for his voice role as Gagumber in the anime Sakugan.

Personal life
On April 29, 2022, Smith married voice actress Cindy Robinson.

Filmography

Anime

Animation

Film

Video games

References

External links
 
 
 
 Christopher Corey Smith at Voice Chasers

Living people
American male video game actors
American male voice actors
Place of birth missing (living people)
20th-century American male actors
21st-century American male actors
Year of birth missing (living people)